Dzharylhak National Nature Park is a national park of Ukraine that covers Dzharylhach Island and the adjacent Karkinit Bay in the northern reaches of the Black Sea. Famous for clean sandy beaches and mineral springs in its many small lakes, Dzharylhach is the largest island in the Black Sea. Portions of the park have been protected nature reserves for almost 100 years, as the area is an environmentally sensitive representative of north Black Sea Coast nature habitat. Administratively, the park is in the Skadovsk District of Kherson Oblast.

Topography
Dzharylhach Island is a long, thin line of sand and shoals, running west-to-east in the bay between the Crimean Peninsula to the south, and the mainland to the north. At times of low water, the shoals can become exposed to join the island as a spit of the mainland. The coastal waters are very shallow, typically less than 1 meter. The characteristic salty soil of the island is called solonetz. The bay is part of the Ramsar Wetland of International Importance.

Climate and ecoregion
Winds of 6–12 m/s are observed an average of 223 days per year; absolute calm is very rare.

Flora and fauna
The plants on the island are specialized for the environment, and include psammophytes (plants that grow in loose and shifting sand), halophytes (plants adapted to saline habitats), reed-beds in fresh and saline wetlands, the representative flora of coastal meadows and seaside steppe, and synanthropes (wild plants associated with proximity to humans, in this case tree and shrub plantations). Over 500 species of vascular plants, in 72 families are recorded in the terrestrial borders of the park.

There are over 80 species of invertebrates in the park. Because the area contains many shallow coastal flats with protective thickets, it is famous for crayfish, crabs, and fish. The bay itself is known for mussels and fish. Wild animals include deer, boar, and mouflon (a type of wild sheep).

Public use
Park management sponsors educational programs for children and school groups, as well as public-awareness activities and ecological tours. The park also sponsors balanced recreational access to beaches, subject to small fees and protection of environmentally sensitive zones. The area is important for waterfowl. The vulnerable red-breasted goose is endemic to the area

See also
 National Parks of Ukraine

References

External links

National parks of Ukraine
Skadovsk Raion